{ "type": "ExternalData",
  "service": "geoline",
  "ids": "Q1439245",
  "properties": {
    "stroke": "#3b78cb",
    "stroke-width": 3} }
Rodenberger Aue is a river of Lower Saxony, Germany. It flows into the Westaue near Hagenburg.

Tributaries
In brackets: origin Deister, Süntel or Bückeberg
 Flöttenbach (Deister)
 Eimbeckhäuser Dorfbach (Deister)
 Walterbach or Waltershagener Bach (Deister)
 Hülseder Bach (Süntel)
 Meinser Bach (Süntel)
 Riesbach (Bückeberg)
 Pohler Bach (Süntel)
 Altenhäger Bach (Deister)
 Blumenhäger Bach (Deister)
 Schlierbach (Deister)
 Salzbach (Bückeberg)
 Ackersbeeke (Deister)
 Rodebach (Deister)
 Rieper Flahbach (Bückeberg)

See also
List of rivers of Lower Saxony

References

Rivers of Lower Saxony
Rivers of Germany